Events in the year 2002 in Gabon.

Incumbents 

 President: Omar Bongo Ondimba
 Prime Minister: Jean-François Ntoutoume Emane

Events 

 The Akanda National Park was set up in the country.

Deaths

References 

 
2000s in Gabon
Years of the 21st century in Gabon
Gabon